Top Model Sverige, Season 3 is the third Season of the Swedish reality television show in which a number of women compete for the title of Sweden's Next Top Model and a chance to start their career in the modelling industry. The prize also included a feature in Swedish Elle and a contract with IMG Models. The finalists live and compete in Los Angeles. Swedish model Caroline Winberg took over as host, after Izabella Scorupco, host of the show in the first two seasons, stepped back to concentrate on other aspects of her career.

Contestants
(ages stated are at start of contest)

Episodes

Episode 1
Original Air Date: January 21, 2013

The 20 semi-finalists go through casting. 10 are chosen as finalists.

Episode 2
Original Air Date: January 28, 2013

The girls move into their home in Venice Beach. The girls are tested on their fashion knowledge. The girls are then photographed with Nigel Barker for a Panos Emporio ad.
 First call-out: Josefin Gustafsson
 Bottom two: Jasmine Sjöberg & Josefin Toomson
 Eliminated: Jasmine Sjöberg
 Special guests: Emina Cunmulaj, Josh Otten, Nigel Barker

Episode 3
Original Air Date: February 4, 2013

The girls find out that they will be getting makeovers. They are told what they'll be getting, but not everyone is happy. Eleonore is upset over the fact that she is getting short hair, and refuses to have her makeover done, which leads to Jonas and Caroline deciding on having Eleonore leave the competition. 
 Disqualified: Eleonore Lilja
When the girls return at their house, they meet Jasmine who reveals that she has returned to the competition. They then have a photoshoot where they pose with diamonds worth almost 4 billion dollars, but they all freak out when they find out they are going to be posing with Gloria, a tarantula.
 First call-out: Josefin Toomson
 Bottom two: Fatou Khan & Malin Ekholm
 Eliminated: Fatou Khan
 Special guests: Carson Kressley, Valentina Nourse

Episode 4
Original Air Date: February 11, 2013

The girls have a challenge where they do trapeze acts and learn about body control, but when Pamela does a few wrong steps, she hurts her neck and she has to be taken to the hospital. Thankfully, she wasn't injured. The girls have a photoshoot where they pose as cowgirls on an electric bull.
 First call-out: Josefin Toomson
 Bottom two: Izabell Hahn & Josefin Gustafsson
 Eliminated: Izabell Hahn
 Special guests: Emina Cunmulaj, Luiz Mattos

Episode 5
Original Air Date: February 18, 2013

The girls go to a fake casting for a toothbrush commercial. Some girls struggle with their English. The girls do a test ad for Maybelline where they are jumping from a ladder. The girls are given the opportunity to call to their friends and family for the first time since the beginning of the competition.
 First call-out: Shams Ben-Mannana
 Bottom two: Afnan Maaz & Malin Ekholm
 Eliminated: Afnan Maaz
 Special guests: Ivan Bart, Linda Mehrens, Yogi Cameron

Episode 6
Original Air Date: February 25, 2013

The girls are taught about branding. They then have a wrestling photoshoot.
 First call-out: Malin Ekholm
 Bottom two: Josefin Toomson & Pamela Olivera
 Eliminated: Josefin Toomson
 Special guests: Janice Dickinson, Luiz Mattos

Episode 7
Original Air Date: March 4, 2013

The girls are taught about make-up and they battle for a trip for two to New York Fashion Week. After their lesson, they are put to the test, but they have to do their make-up in a shaky taxi. The girls have a photoshoot where they have to embody Madonna.
 First call-out: Josefin Gustafsson
 Bottom two: Jasmine Sjöberg & Malin Ekholm
 Eliminated: Jasmine Sjöberg
 Special guests: Aaron Newbill, Linda Mehrens, Tracey Morris

Episode 8
Original Air Date: March 11, 2013

The girls learn about acting, and are coached by Chris Carmack. For their photoshoot, the girls have to pose as rock stars.
 First call-out: Pamela Olivera
 Bottom two: Josefin Gustafsson & Malin Ekholm
 Eliminated: Malin Ekholm
 Special guests: Chris Carmack, Josh Otten, Mini Andén

Episode 9
Original Air Date: March 18, 2013

The girls go on go-sees. Later Caroline takes the girls to a sweaty work out session. The girls have a photoshoot with a leopard.
 First call-out: Josefin Gustafsson
 Bottom two: Pamela Olivera & Shams Ben-Mannana
 Eliminated: Pamela Olivera
 Special guests: Aaron Newbill, Patrik Andersson

Episode 10
Original Air Date: March 25, 2013

For the challenge, the girls pose for Ragdoll. Later, the girls travel back home to Sweden and Stockholm where the competition began, and do their Elle cover shoot. The girls practice their walks, and are then tested as they sell Haute Couture dresses designed by Lars Wallin for the judges. In the end, Josefin is crowned as the sixth winner.
 Sweden's Next Top Model: Josefin Gustafsson
 Runner-up: Shams Ben-Mannana
 Special guests: Cia Jansson, Hermine Coyet Ohlén, Joanna Olsson, Lars Wallin

Episode 11
Original Air Date: April 1, 2013

This episode was the recap episode, where highlights and never before seen scenes were shown.

Summaries

Call-out order

 The contestant was eliminated
 The contestant was immune from elimination
 The contestant was disqualified from the competition
 The contestant won the competition

 Episode 1 was the casting episode. Shams automatically advanced to the top 10 as a result of having performed the best during the runway challenge at the beginning of the episode. The call-out order did not reflect the models' performance that week.
 In Episode 3, Eleonore was disqualified for refusing to have her hair cut during the makeovers. Jasmine returned to the competition to replace her.
 Episode 11 was the recap episode.

Photo Shoot Guide
Episode 1 Photo shoot: Interpretations of High Fashion in Stockholm (Casting)
Episode 2 Photo shoot: Panos Emporio Swimwear
Episode 3 Photo shoot: Beauty Shots with a Tarantula
Episode 4 Photo shoot: Riding a Mechanical bull
Episode 5 Photo shoot: Leaping on a Rooftop for Maybelline Cosmetics
Episode 6 Photo shoot: Day of the Dead Seductresses
Episode 7 Photo shoot: Embodying Madonna
Episode 8 Photo shoot: Rock Singers
Episode 9 Photo shoot: Posing in a Field with a Leopard
Episode 10 Photo shoot: Elle Covers

References

Sweden's Next Top Supermodel
2013 Swedish television seasons

it:Sweden's Next Top Model
sv:Top Model Sverige